Paavo Valakari (born 28 December 1997) is a Finnish professional footballer who plays for Käpylän Pallo, as a goalkeeper.

Career
Valakari signed with Käpylän Pallo for the 2019 season.

Personal life
His father Simo and brother Onni have also played football professionally.

References

1997 births
Living people
Finnish footballers
Seinäjoen Jalkapallokerho players
SJK Akatemia players
Lapuan Virkiä players
Salon Palloilijat players
Veikkausliiga players
Kakkonen players
Association football goalkeepers
Käpylän Pallo players
JJK Jyväskylä players
Ykkönen players
Footballers from Helsinki